Emircan Haney (born 1 January 2001) is a Turkish male compound archer and part of the national team.

Sport career
In 2022, Emircan Haney won the gold medal in the men's team compound event at the European Archery Championships held in Munich, Germany. He also won the silver medal in the mixed Team event. Completing the podium were the Turkish pair Yesim Bostan and Emircan Haney, who defeated Belgium's Sarah Prieels and Quinten van Looy 156-155. He won the silver medal in the men's team compound event at the Laško, Slovenia event in the 2022 European Indoor Archery Championships.

References

External links
 

2001 births
Living people
Turkish male archers
Islamic Solidarity Games medalists in archery
21st-century Turkish people